The term il Fiammenghino translates it the Flemish man, referring to someone from the medieval region of Flanders.
Among those with this nickname were:
 Giovanni Mauro della Rovere, painter
 Angelo Everardi, painter